Dindica is a genus of moths in the family Geometridae.

Species
 Dindica alaopis Prout, 1932
 Dindica discordia Inoue, 1990
 Dindica glaucescens Inoue, 1990
 Dindica hepatica Inoue, 1990
 Dindica kishidai Inoue, 1986
 Dindica limatula Inoue, 1990
 Dindica marginata Warren, 1894
 Dindica olivacea Inoue, 1990
 Dindica owadai Inoue, 1990
 Dindica pallens Inoue, 1990
Dindica para Swinhoe, 1891
Dindica para para Swinhoe, 1891 (=Dindica erythropunctura Chu, 1981)
Dindica para malayana Inoue, 1990
 Dindica polyphaenaria (Guenée, [1858]) (=Hypochroma basiflavata Moore, 1868)
 Dindica purpurata Bastelberger, 1911
 Dindica semipallens Inoue, 1990
 Dindica subrosea (Warren, 1893) (=Perissolophia subsimilis Warren, 1898)
 Dindica subvirens Yazaki & Wang, 2004
 Dindica sundae Prout, 1935
 Dindica taiwana Wileman, 1914
 Dindica tienmuensis Chu, 1981
 Dindica virescens (Butler, 1878) (=Pseudoterpna koreana Alphéraky, 1897, Dindica virescens yuwanina Kawazoe & Ogata, [1963]
 Dindica wilemani Prout, 1927
 Dindica wytsmani Prout, 1927

References
 Dindica at Markku Savela's Lepidoptera and Some Other Life Forms
 Natural History Museum Lepidoptera genus database

Pseudoterpnini
Geometridae genera